SS Morro Castle was an American ocean liner that caught fire and ran aground on the morning of September 8, 1934, en route from Havana, Cuba, to New York City, United States, with the loss of 137 passengers and crew.

On the previous evening, Morro Castles captain, Robert Willmott, had died suddenly, and his place was taken by Chief Officer William Warms as a strong northeast wind was developing under heavy cloud. At 2:50am, a fire was detected in a storage locker which burned through electrical cables, engulfed the ship in flames, and plunged it into darkness. Response by crew, Coast Guard, and rescue vessels was notably slow and inefficient, with empty capacity in the lifeboats. The decks were too hot to stand on, smoke made breathing difficult, and passengers were forced to leap into ocean swells where swimming was impossible. By mid-afternoon Morro Castle was abandoned and the survivors were landed on the shores of New Jersey by an assortment of craft.

The cause of the fire was never established, though an overheated funnel and certain points of cabin design and electrical circuitry were noted. A theory of arson by a crew member has attracted support over the years, albeit without any concrete evidence. The high casualties are chiefly blamed on the crew's incompetent handling of the emergency.

Building
On May 22, 1928, the United States Congress passed the Merchant Marine Act of 1928, creating a $250 million construction fund to be lent to U.S. shipping companies to replace old and outdated ships with new ones. Each of these loans, which could subsidize as much as 75% of the cost of the ship, was to be paid back over 20 years at low interest rates.

One company that availed itself of this opportunity was the New York and Cuba Mail Steam Ship Company, better known as the Ward Line, which had been carrying passengers, cargo and mail to and from Cuba since the mid-19th century. Naval architects were hired by the line to design a pair of passenger liners to be named Morro Castle, after the stone fortress and lighthouse in Havana, and Oriente, after Oriente Province in Cuba.

At the Newport News Shipbuilding and Dry Dock Company, work was begun on Morro Castle in January 1929. In March 1930 the ship was christened, followed in May by her sister ship Oriente. Each ship was luxuriously finished to accommodate 489 passengers in first and tourist class, along with 240 crew members and officers. In a growing age of passenger ships having cruiser sterns, Morro Castle and Oriente were built with classic counter sterns.

As built, Morro Castle was equipped with direction finding and submarine signalling equipment. Submarine signalling was becoming obsolete as a form of communication, so by 1934 it had been removed. By that year echo sounding equipment and a gyrocompass had been installed on the ship.

Career

Morro Castle began her maiden voyage on August 23, 1930. She lived up to expectations by completing the maiden 1,100+ mile southbound trip in just under 59 hours, and the return trip took only 58 hours. Over the next four years, Morro Castle and Oriente were luxury ship workhorses, rarely out of service and, despite the worsening of the Great Depression, able to maintain a steady clientele. Their success was in part due to Prohibition, as such trips provided a relatively affordable and (more importantly) legal means of enjoying a non-stop drinking party. Their reasonable rates also attracted Cuban and American businessmen and older couples, making the ships a microcosm of America.

Final voyage

Impending nor'easter
The final voyage of Morro Castle began in Havana on September 5, 1934. On the afternoon of the 6th, as the ship paralleled the southeastern coast of the United States, it began to encounter increasing clouds and wind. By the morning of the 7th, the clouds had thickened and the winds had shifted to easterly, the first indication of a developing nor'easter. Throughout that day, the winds increased and intermittent rains began, causing many to retire early to their berths.

Captain's death
Early that evening, Captain Robert Rennison Willmott had his dinner delivered to his quarters. Shortly thereafter, he complained of stomach trouble and, not long after that, died of an apparent heart attack. Command of the ship passed to the Chief Officer, William Warms. During the overnight hours, the winds increased to over 30 miles per hour as the Morro Castle plodded its way up the eastern seaboard.

Fire

At around 2:50 a.m. on September 8, while the ship was sailing around eight nautical miles off Long Beach Island, a fire was detected in a storage locker within the First Class Writing Room on B Deck. Within the next 30 minutes, the Morro Castle became engulfed in flames. As the fire grew in intensity, Acting Captain Warms attempted to beach the ship, but the growing need to launch lifeboats and abandon ship forced him to give up his plan.

Within 20 minutes of the fire's discovery (at about 3:10), the fire had burned through the ship's main electrical cables, plunging the Morro Castle into darkness. As all power was lost, the radio stopped working, so only a single SOS signal was sent. At about the same time, the wheelhouse lost the ability to steer the ship, as those hydraulic lines were severed by the fire as well.

Cut off by the fire amidships, passengers tended to move toward the stern. Most crew members, on the other hand, moved to the forecastle. In many places, the deck boards were hot to the touch, and breathing was difficult in the thick smoke. As conditions grew steadily worse, the decision became either "jump or burn" for many passengers. However, jumping into the water was problematic, as high winds churned up great waves that made swimming extremely difficult.

On the decks of the burning ship, the crew and passengers exhibited the full range of reactions to the disaster at hand. Some crew members were incredibly brave as they tried to fight the fire. Others tossed deck chairs and life rings overboard to provide persons in the water with makeshift flotation devices.

Only six of the ship's twelve lifeboats were launched: boats 1, 3, 5, 9, and 11 on the starboard side, and boat 10 on the port side. Although the combined capacity of these boats was 408, they carried only 85 people, most of them crew members. Many passengers died for lack of knowledge of how to use the life preservers. As they hit the water, life preservers knocked many persons unconscious, leading to subsequent death by drowning, or broke victims' necks from the impact, killing them instantly.

Rescue efforts at sea

The rescuers were slow to react. The first rescue ship to arrive on the scene was Andrea F. Luckenbach. Two other ships—Monarch of Bermuda and City of Savannah—were slow in taking action after receiving the SOS but eventually did arrive on the scene.

The Coast Guard vessels  and  positioned themselves too far away to see the victims in the water and rendered little assistance. The Coast Guard's aerial station at Cape May, New Jersey, failed to send their float planes until local radio stations started reporting that dead bodies were washing ashore on the New Jersey beaches, from Point Pleasant Beach to Spring Lake.

In time, additional small boats arrived on the scene. The large ocean swells presented a major problem, making it very difficult to see people in the water. A plane piloted by Harry Moore, Governor of New Jersey and Commander of the New Jersey Guard, helped boats to find survivors and bodies by dipping its wings and dropping markers.

Recovery efforts on shore
As telephone calls and radio stations spread news of the disaster along the New Jersey coast, local citizens assembled on the coastline to assist the injured, retrieve the dead, and try to unite families that had been scattered among different rescue boats that landed on the New Jersey beaches.

By mid-morning, the ship was totally abandoned and its burning hull drifted ashore, coming to a stop late that afternoon in shallow water off Asbury Park, New Jersey, at almost the exact spot where the New Era had wrecked in 1854. The fires continued to smoulder for the next two days and, in the end, 135 passengers and crew (out of a total of 549) were lost.

The ship was declared a total loss, and its charred hulk was finally towed away from the Asbury Park shoreline on March 14, 1935. According to one account, it later started settling by the stern and sank while being towed and had to be refloated. (Other accounts have it that the ship was towed without any issues). Regardless, it was towed to Gravesend Bay and then to Baltimore on March 29, 1935, where it was scrapped.

In the intervening months, because of its proximity to the boardwalk and the Asbury Park Convention Hall pier, from which it was possible to wade out and touch the wreck with one's hands, the wreck was treated as a destination for sightseeing trips, complete with stamped penny souvenirs and postcards for sale.

Factors contributing to the fire
The design of the ship, the materials used in her construction, and questionable crew practices and mistakes escalated the on-board fire to a roaring inferno that would eventually destroy the ship.

Construction materials
As far as the materials used in her construction were concerned, the elegant but highly flammable decor of the ship—veneered wooden surfaces and glued ply paneling—helped the fire to spread quickly.

Ship's structure and lack of safety features
The structure of the ship also created a number of problems. Although the ship had fire doors, there existed a wood-lined, six-inch opening between the wooden ceilings and the steel bulkheads. This provided the fire with a flammable pathway that bypassed the fire doors, enabling it to spread.

Whereas the ship had electric sensors that could detect fires in any of the ship's staterooms, crew quarters, offices, cargo holds and engine room, there were no such detectors in the ship's lounges, dance hall, writing room, library, tea room, or dining room.

Although there were 42 water hydrants on board, the system was designed with the assumption that no more than six would ever have to be used at any one time. When the emergency aboard the Morro Castle occurred, the crew opened virtually all working hydrants, dropping the water pressure to unusable levels everywhere.

The ship's Lyle gun, which is designed to fire a line to another ship to facilitate passenger evacuation in an emergency, was stored over the Morro Castle's writing room, which is where the fire originated. The Lyle gun exploded just before 3 a.m., further spreading the fire and breaking windows, thereby allowing the near gale force winds to enter the ship and fan the flames.

Finally, fire alarms on the ship produced a "muffled, scarcely audible ring", according to passengers.

Crew practices and deficiencies
Crew practices and deficiencies added to the severity of the on-board fire. According to surviving crewmen, painting the ship had been a common practice to keep it looking new and to keep crewmen busy. Unfortunately, the thick layers of paint that resulted from this practice made the ship more flammable and strips of paint broke off during the fire, helping to spread the flames. The storage locker in which the fire started held blankets that had been dry cleaned using 1930s technology, which utilized flammable dry cleaning fluids (although it is unlikely that significant amounts of the fluid would remain).

Although the ship had fire doors, their automatic trip wires (designed to close when a certain temperature was reached) had been disconnected. None of the crew thought to operate them manually at the time of the fire. That said, it is unlikely that that would have made much difference, as the six-inch opening between the wooden ceilings and the steel bulkheads would have allowed the flames to spread even if the fire doors had closed.

Many of the hose stations on the promenade deck had been recently deactivated in response to an incident about a month before, when a passenger slipped on a deck moistened by a leaking hose station and sued the passenger line.

Although regulations required that fire drills be held on each voyage, only the crew members participated. Passengers were not required to attend.

For quite some time after the fire was discovered, the ship continued on its course and speed—pointed directly into the wind. This no doubt helped to fan the fire.

In an attempt to reach passengers in some suites, crewmen broke windows on several decks, allowing the high winds to enter the ship and hasten the fire's fury.

Because the wireless operators could not get a definitive answer from the captain, the SOS was not ordered until 3:18 and was not sent until 3:23. Within five minutes, the intense heat of the fire began to distort her signal. Shortly thereafter, emergency generators failed and transmissions ceased.

Aftermath

Inquiries
In the inquiries that followed the disaster, there were criticisms of the response of the First Officer's handling of the ship, the crew's response to the fire, and the delay in calling for assistance.

The inquiries concluded that there was no organized effort by the officers to fight and control the fire or close the fire doors. Additionally, the crew made no effort to take their regular fire stations. More damning was the conclusion that, with a few notable exceptions, the crew made no effort to direct passengers to safe pathways to the boat deck. For many passengers, the only course of action was to lower themselves into the water or jump overboard. The few lifeboats that were launched carried primarily crew, and no efforts were made by these boats to maneuver toward the ship's stern to pick up additional people.

The newly promoted Captain Warms never left the bridge to determine the extent of damage and maintained the ship's bearing and full speed for some distance after the fire was known. As systems failed throughout the ship because of power loss, no effort was made to use the emergency steering gear or emergency lighting.

Warms, Chief Engineer Eban Abbott, and Ward Line vice-president Henry Cabaud were eventually indicted on various charges relating to the incident, including willful negligence; all three were convicted and sent to jail. However, an appeals court later overturned Warms' and Abbott's convictions, deciding that a fair amount of the blame could be attributed to the dead Captain Willmott.

In the inquiry that followed the disaster, Chief Radio Operator George White Rogers was made out to be a hero because, having been unable to get a clear order from the bridge, he sent a distress call of his own accord amidst life-threatening conditions. Later, however, suspicion was directed at Rogers when he was convicted of attempting to murder his police colleague with an incendiary device. Additionally, his crippled victim, Vincent "Bud" Doyle, spent the better part of his life attempting to prove that Rogers had set the Morro Castle fire. In 1954, Rogers was convicted of murdering a neighboring couple for money, and he died three and a half years later in prison.

Liability claims
The New York Times reported the end of the inquiry on March 27, 1937, with an order by Federal Judge John C. Knox affixing liability at $890,000, an average of $2,225 per victim. About half the claims were for deaths. The order reportedly included agreement by 95% of the claimants. The order also barred further claims against the steamship company and its subsidiary, the Agwi Navigation Company, operators of the vessel. Several months' work remained in deciding each claim individually by the lawyer members of the Morro Castle Committee. Damages were fixed under the Death on the High Seas Act.

Causes
Officially, the fire's cause was never determined. In the mid-1980s, HBO television aired a dramatization of the fire in an episode of their Catastrophe series, titled "The Mystery of the Morro Castle". The dramatization starred John Goodman as Radio Officer George Rogers and blamed Rogers for causing the fire. In 2002, the A&E television network made a documentary about the incident. Both the HBO dramatization and the A&E documentary reawakened speculation that the fire was actually arson committed by a crew member. Other theories included a short circuit in the wiring that passed through the rear of the locker, the spontaneous combustion of chemically treated blankets in the locker, or an overheating of the ship's one functioning funnel, situated just aft of the locker.

William McFee, a well-known writer of sea stories who had served as an engineer on oil-fired steamers, wrote in 1949 that "if the burners were neglected... [the] long uptakes which lead from the furnaces to the funnel would become dangerously overheated", as he once found on another ship, whose "funnel was glowing red-hot just above the uptakes". The Morro Castles funnel was clad in flammable material where it passed through the passenger quarters, and several people had noticed smoke as early as midnight. The ship was making 19 knots against a 20-knot headwind and simply overheated, according to McFee, but the high loss of life was caused by the crew's incompetent handling of the emergency.

Furthermore, Cuban writer Renée Méndez Capote was aboard when the tragedy happened, en route to New York City where she would travel to Paris to take over administration of the Cuban Consulate there. Trapped in her cabin as the ship became engulfed in flames, she was found by crew members. Because of her corpulence, she had to be removed through a hatch. American steward Carol Prior gave her his flotation device, thereby saving her life. Upon her arrival in New York City, she was interviewed by the American press. Because she expressed sympathy with the Cuban communist party, she was accused of being a "communist agitator" and the author of the fire that destroyed the ship. Capote later declared, “That fire is—undoubtedly—the worst memory I've ever had."

Burials
Some victims of the fire are buried in the Mount Prospect Cemetery in Neptune, New Jersey, along the coast.

Call sign
The Morro Castles radio call sign, KGOV, is still registered to the ship by the FCC nearly 90 years after her demise, and is therefore unavailable for use by broadcast stations.

Memorial
On September 8, 2009, the first and only memorial to the victims, rescuers, and survivors of the Morro Castle disaster was dedicated on the south side of Convention Hall in Asbury Park, very near the spot where the burned-out hull of the ship finally came aground. The day marked the 75th anniversary of the disaster.

The Morro Castle ship's bell is now at SUNY Maritime's Fort Schuyler.

In media and popular culture

In film and television
Despite the tragedy and mystery of the Morro Castle disaster, no film for theatrical distribution nor even a television movie was made of the story, excepting the aforementioned HBO dramatization and A&E documentary. Shortly after he was hired by Metro-Goldwyn-Mayer following his emigration from Germany to the United States in 1934, Fritz Lang collaborated with Hollywood scriptwriter Oliver H. P. Garrett on a screenplay about the disaster entitled Hell Afloat, but it was never filmed. However, there have been references to it:
 Movietone News Reel: https://www.youtube.com/watch?v=dI0wWSEe3t0
 A fire aboard a ship making the New York-Cuba run, an evident allusion to the Morro Castle, is shown in the film Exclusive Story (1936).
 At the end of the Spencer Tracy film Dante's Inferno (1935), a gambling cruise ship (resembling the Morro Castle) is completely ablaze.
 In the film Boy Meets Girl (1938), James Cagney (in dictating a letter to Pat O'Brien regarding what a third person is supposed to be saying to his missing wife) says, "I did not go down on the Morro Castle!"
 In the early moments of the film, Doomed to Die (1940, one of six Monogram releases featuring the fictional Mr. Wong), film footage of the burning Morro Castle is shown, although for the film's plot it is referred as the Wentworth Castle.
 An exploitative mention is also made in the detective film The Man Who Wouldn't Die (1942): one suspect was assumed to have perished on this ship but survived, unbeknownst to another.
 The movie Minstrel Man (1944) features the fire and sinking of the Morro Castle. 
 In the film The World Was His Jury (1958), Edmond O'Brien portrays an attorney defending a ship's first officer on trial for negligence after the ocean liner he has taken command of (following the sudden death of the original captain during the voyage) burns to a hulk off NY/NJ, killing a great many passengers. Most of the case's points closely mirror those of the Morro Castle.
 Newsreel footage of the disaster opens The Untouchables TV episode "The Underground Court", in which a fictitious character in the episode is an apparent survivor of the tragedy.
 The sinking was featured in an episode of Mysteries at the Museum (2013).

In music
 The first artists to remember the tragedy of the Morro Castle were the members of the Trio Matamoros of Santiago de Cuba, with the meltingly beautiful song "El desastre del Morro Castle" (1934).
 The Morro Castle disaster occurred when the musical Anything Goes, a comedy set aboard an ocean liner, was about to open. Under the circumstances, the producers decided that going ahead would be in bad taste, and cancelled the opening. The musical was then subjected to several rewrites before finally opening later in 1934.
 In 1970, the West Coast music critic Philip Elwood described the early Bruce Springsteen-led, and Asbury Park-based, Steel Mill as "the first big thing that's happened to Asbury Park since the good ship Morro Castle burned to the waterline of that Jersey beach in '34".

In literature
 The ship is referenced in Samuel Beckett's novel Murphy, published in 1938.
 The ship provided inspiration for William Burroughs' "Twilight's Last Gleamings", a version of which was published in his Nova Express.
The ship is referenced in William H. Gass’s novel The Tunnel.

See also
 
 
 
 
 
 Herbert Saffir—a survivor of the Morro Castle
 Star Princess (2001)

References

Further reading
 (Whitcraft is the Founder and President of the New Jersey Maritime Museum in Beach Haven, New Jersey, which has a room dedicated to the Morrow Castle.)

Book, Mrs. Astor's Horse by Stanley Walker, copyright 1935 and published by Frederick A. Stokes Company of New York. Essay, "Something To Remember You By", pages 20–30. Lengthy descriptions of the looting activity and commercialization of the event, including beachside hot dog vendors and rental planes which took onlookers out to view the smoldering hulk of the burned ship.

External links

1930 ships
Maritime incidents in 1934
Ship fires
Ships of the Ward Line
Shipwrecks of the New Jersey coast
Turbo-electric steamships
1934 in New Jersey